The 2018 season is Sandefjord's second season in a row in the Eliteserien following their promotion in 2016.

Squad

Players out on loan

Transfers

Winter

In:

Out:

Summer

In:

Out:

Friendlies

Competitions

Eliteserien

Results summary

Results by round

Results

Table

Norwegian Cup

Squad statistics

Appearances and goals

|-
|colspan="14"|Players away from Sandefjord on loan:

|-
|colspan="14"|Players who appeared for Sandefjord no longer at the club:

|}

Goal scorers

Disciplinary record

References 

2018
Sandefjord